Heinz-Peter Thül (born 27 July 1963) is a German professional golfer who played on the European Tour.

Thül started playing golf at age 8 and has played in 350 tournaments over three decades. By the time of Bernhard Langer's wedding in 1984 he was considered Germany's number two golfer, and as such would team up with Langer in international matches such as World Cup and Dunhill Cup.

Professional career
Thül turned professional in 1980 and played in his first European Tour the same year. He played another 40 events throughout the 1980s with limited success, until he started competing on the nascent Challenge Tour towards the end of the decade. On the Challenge Tour he recorded four victories between 1988 and 1992, and remained the only German winner until Sven Strüver won the American Express Trophy in 1993. Thül won the 1991 Neuchatel Open in Switzerland, a title he successfully defended a year later, and almost won again in 1996, but lost in a playoff. A pair of runner-up finishes in 1991 ensured Thül finished the year 13th on the Challenge Tour Order of Merit, a result he bettered only once in the next six years when he finished 11th in 1997.  In total, Thül played over 65 Challenge Tour events 1991–2003, recording two wins and six runner-up finishes, in addition to the two Challenge Tour events he won before the order of merit was introduced in 1990.

Thül played almost 200 European Tour events between 1980 and 2000, recording six top-10 finishes. He won the 1989 European Tour Qualifying School at La Manga, and finished 11th on the 1997 Challenge Tour Rankings, earning a spot on the 1998 European Tour. At the 13th hole of the 1st round of the 1993 Spanish Open, he was struck by lightning, but was able to continue playing and finished the tournament in 8th place.

Thül has represented Germany in four World Cups, with best finish fifth place at the 1992 World Cup where he teamed up with Bernhard Langer.
He has also represented Germany in three Dunhill Cups, with best finish a tie for fifth in 1992, together with Bernhard Langer and Torsten Giedeon.

Professional wins (4)

Challenge Tour wins (3)

*Note: The 1992 Neuchâtel Open SBS Trophy was shortened to 36 holes due to rain.

Other wins (1)
1988 Torneo dei Campioni

Team appearances
Professional
World Cup (representing Germany): 1982, 1989, 1992, 1999
Alfred Dunhill Cup (representing Germany): 1992, 1995, 1996

See also

1991 Challenge Tour graduates
1997 Challenge Tour graduates

References

External links
 
 

German male golfers
European Tour golfers
Sportspeople from Cologne
1963 births
Living people